Patrice Lancelot David de Pury known as David de Pury (December 4, 1943 - December 27, 2000) was a Swiss businessman and diplomat. He was the Swiss trade ambassador, representing Swiss interests at the General Agreement on Tariffs & Trade and at the Inter-American Development Bank. He was the chair of ABB, and chair and publisher of Le Temps.

Biography 
De Pury was born into a Swiss family that has been nobilitated in 1651 by Henri II. d'Orléans, Duke of Longueville and had their origins in Neuchatel, Switzerland. His father, Jacques de Pury, was an attorney and head of the Swiss pharmaceutical company Hoffmann-La Roche for which he led Nippon Roche in Tokyo, Japan. His younger brother is Simon de Pury.

De Pury was a delegate of the Federal Council for Trade Agreements in Switzerland and served as Switzerland's Trade Ambassador, and representing the country at the General Agreement on Tariffs & Trade in 1987. De Pury succeeded Fritz Leutwiler as the Co-Chairman of ABB, serving in that capacity from 1992 to 1996. He later served as the Chairman of BBC Brown Hoveri. He held a number of government offices, including working in the Federal Department of Foreign Affairs in Bern. He represented Switzerland in The Hague, Brussels and Washington DC. In the 1980s he served as the Governor for Switzerland at the Inter-American Development Bank. He was a board member of Nestlé, Ciba-Geigy and Zurich Insurance Group and chairman and publisher of Le Temps. In 1996 he co-founded the wealth management firm de Pury, Pictet, Turrettini.

De Pury was Vice President of the Lucerne Classical Music Festival. In 1995 he called for a liberalization of the Swiss economy and was criticized for trying to "dismantle" the welfare state. In April 1993 he spoke to university students at the Harvard Kennedy School about governmental and commercial issues. He was chosen to speak at the school due to his active role in the annual International Management Symposium in St Gallen, Switzerland.

De Pury died from cancer on 27 December 2000 at a hospital in Zürich.

References 

2000 deaths
20th-century Swiss businesspeople
David
Swiss diplomats
Swiss business executives
Swiss hedge fund managers
Swiss publishers (people)